Erik Nævdal Mjelde (born 6 March 1984) is a Norwegian former professional footballer who played as a midfielder. Among his previous clubs are Sandefjord, Lillestrøm, SK Brann and Løv-Ham Fotball. Prior to joining Brann at the age of 16, he played for Fri.

Career
Mjelde made his debut for the Norway U21 national team in 2006 where he played one game. He also played a series of games for other youth national teams (U16, U17, U19). 

After the 2019 season Mjelde decide to retire. In January 2020 he was hired as director of development for Arna-Bjørnar.

Personal life 
He is brother of Maren Mjelde, who plays for Norway national team.

Career statistics

Club

References

External links
 

1984 births
Living people
Footballers from Bergen
Norwegian footballers
Association football midfielders
Norway under-21 international footballers
Norway youth international footballers
Eliteserien players
Norwegian First Division players
SK Brann players
Løv-Ham Fotball players
Sandefjord Fotball players
Lillestrøm SK players